Michael Warren (born 1938, sometimes called Mike) is an English artist, known for painting birds. He has designed several series of commemorative postage stamps and book jackets, as well as publishing books of his own work. His works have also featured on the cover of the RSPB's Birds magazine. He is a member of the Society of Wildlife Artists and the Artists for Nature Foundation.

Biography 

Born in 1938, Warren was educated at Wolverhampton Grammar School and Wolverhampton College of Art.

He is particularly associated with the RSPB reserve at Langford Lowfields.

Warren and his wife live in Nottinghamshire. They have two children.

He is president of Nottinghamshire Birdwatchers, the county's ornithological society.

Postage stamps 

Warren has designed a number of postage stamps, including:

 
 
 

He has also painted designs for a number of "duck stamps" for the Audubon Society of the United States.

Bibliography

As editor

As illustrator

Jacket design

References

External links 
 
 Sample works on SWLA website

1938 births
Living people
British bird artists
20th-century English painters
English male painters
21st-century English painters
Date of birth missing (living people)
People from Nottinghamshire
People educated at Wolverhampton Grammar School
20th-century English male artists
21st-century English male artists